This is a list of different types and forms of desks.

Desk forms and types

Armoire desk
Bargueño desk
Bible box
Bonheur du jour
Bureau à gradin
Bureau brisé
Bureau capucin
Bureau Mazarin
Bureau plat, see Writing table
Butler's desk
Campaign desk
Carlton house desk
Carrel desk
Cheveret desk
Computer desk
Credenza desk
Cubicle desk
Cylinder desk
Davenport desk
Desk and bench
Desk on a chest
Desk on a frame
Drawing table
Ergonomic desk
Escritoire
Fall-front desk
Field desk
Fire screen desk
Games table desk
Lap desk
Lectern desk
Liseuse desk
Mechanical desk
Metamorphic library steps
Moore desk
Partners desk
Pedestal desk
Plantation desk
Portable desk
Rolltop desk
School desk
Secrétaire à abattant, see Fall-front desk
Secretaire en portefeuille
Secretary desk
Shtender
Slant-top desk
Spinet desk
Standing desk
Student desk
Tambour desk
Tanker desk, see Pedestal desk
Telephone desk
Treadmill desk
Trestle desk
Typewriter desk
Wooton desk
Writing armchair
Writing desk
Writing table

See also
Bureau du Roi
Henry VIII's writing desk
Resolute desk

References

Aronson, Joseph. The Encyclopedia of Furniture. 3rd edition. New York: Crown Publishers Inc., 1965.
Bedel, Jean. Le grand guide des styles. Paris: Hachette, 1996.
Boyce, Charles. Dictionary of Furniture. New York: Roundtable Press, 1985.
Comstock, Helen. American Furniture: 17th, 18th and 19th century styles. Lancaster, Pennsylvania: Schiffer Publishing, Ltd. 1997
Duncan, Alastair. Mobilier art déco. Paris: Thames and Hudson, 2000
Forrest, Tim. The Bulfinch Anatomy of Antique Furniture. London: Marshall editions, 1996.
Hinckley, F. Lewis. A Directory of Antique Furniture: The Authentic Classification of European and American Designs. New York: Bonanza Books, 1988.
Moser, Thomas. Measured Shop Drawings for American Furniture. New York: Sterling Publishing Inc., 1985.
Nutting, Wallace. Furniture Treasury. New York: Macmillan Publishers, 1963.
Oglesby, Catherine. French provincial decorative art. New York: Charles Scribner's Sons, 1951.
Payne, Christopher, Ed. Sotheby's Concise Encyclopedia of Furniture. London: Conran Octopus, 1989.
Pélegrin-Genel, Elisabeth. L'art de vivre au bureau. Paris: Flammarion, 1995.
Reyniès, Nicole de. Le mobilier domestique: Vocabulaire Typologique. Paris: Imprimerie Nationale, 1987.